The Banks Track is a 31 kilometre private walking track on the Banks Peninsula on the South Island of New Zealand in the Canterbury region. The track opened in 1989 as the first privately owned track in New Zealand.

Tramping
The track is open from October through April. Hut accommodations along the track are unique and well-equipped.

The route

The track sections are:
 Onuku Farm (outside Akaroa) to Flea Bay Cottage (11 km)
 Flea Bay Cottage to Stony Bay Cottage (8 km)
 Stony Bay Cottage to Akaroa (12 km)

Flora and fauna
Among the fauna that may be observed are yellow-eyed penguins, little penguins, spotted shags, sooty shearwaters, fur seals, and Hector's dolphins. Flora observed include nikau palm, kahikatea, and tree ferns.

Ecotourism
The establishment and ongoing stewardship of the track is an example of ecotourism. The track was established by ten landowners, mostly farmers, as a means of supplementing income in response to the fiscal pressures caused by drought and elimination of farm subsidies in the 1980s. A limited liability company was formed to manage track operations. In return for use of the land, track maintenance, and providing accommodations, landowners are given an annual sum based on several factors, including the number of walkers, the amount of land traversed by the track and level of responsibility for track operations.

References

External links
 Official website

Banks Peninsula
Hiking and tramping tracks in Canterbury, New Zealand
Tourist attractions in Canterbury, New Zealand